The University of West Bohemia Rector election, 2014 was held on 19 November 2014. The incumbent Rector Ilona Mauritzová sought reelection but was defeated by Chairman of the Research Center New Technologies Miroslav Holeček.

Candidates
 Ladislav Čepička, Vice-dean at the Faculty of Education.
 Nikolaj Demjančuk, Chairman of Catedra of Philosophy at the Faculty Philosophy and Arts
 Miroslav Holeček, Chairman of Research Center NTC. He ran for the position in 2010 but was defeated by Mauritzová.
 Ilona Mauritzová, the incumbent Rector. She was previously Dean of The Faculty of Health Care Studies. She is the first female Rector of the University.

Background
Candidates were allowed to register till 27 September 2014. Incumbent Rector Ilona Mauritzová decided to seek reelection. Her rival from previous election Miroslav Holeček also decided to run. Ladislav Čepička from faculty of Education and Nikolaj Demjančuk from the Faculty Philosophy and Arts also decided to stand.

The first debate was held on 22 October 2014. Holeček stated that vision is a key for the University. He believes that University should know its direction. He wants it to have a good name and use its inner diversity and cooperation of faculties to its benefit. Mauritzová stated that university should consolidate itself and should focus on its strategic goals in the new period. Demjančuk supported stronger autonomy of faculties. Čepička wanted the university step from average.

Opinion Survey

Voting

Voting was held on 19 November 2014. 59 members of academic senate voted. Candidate needed to win at least 30 votes to be elected. Mauritzová received highest number of votes in the first round. Holeček also advanced to the second round. Second round was held afterwards. Holeček defeated Mautzová when he received 32 votes.

Aftermath

Czech president Miloš Zeman appointed Holeček on 5 February 2015. Holeček was inaugurated on 2 April 2015 and became the new Rector.

Mauritzová returned to the Faculty of Health Care Studies and became its dean.

Notes

2014
2014 elections in the Czech Republic
Non-partisan elections